St. John Henry Newman Catholic Secondary School is a Catholic secondary school located in the community of Stoney Creek in Hamilton. It is part of the Hamilton-Wentworth Catholic District School Board and is known for its sports teams as well as its various stage performances.

History 
Established in 1975 as Cardinal Newman Catholic Secondary School, the school was named after John Henry Newman. According to The Fraser Institute's research of Ontario High Schools in 2010, Cardinal Newman ranked in the top 10th percentile of top rated secondary schools in Ontario, and in 2015, was named one of two highest rated schools in the Greater Hamilton Area.

In October 2019, the school was renamed to St. John Henry Newman Catholic Secondary School following Newman's canonization in the Roman Catholic Church.

Notable alumni 
 Andrea Horwath – Mayor of Hamilton, Ontario
 Eric Mezzalira – linebacker for the Calgary Stampeders 
 Lou Nagy – North American Soccer League soccer player
 Paul Popowich – actor

See also 
 List of secondary schools in Ontario

References

External links 
 
 

High schools in Hamilton, Ontario
Catholic secondary schools in Ontario
Educational institutions established in 1975
1975 establishments in Ontario
Roman Catholic schools in Ontario